The 6th Rand Grand Prix was a motor race, run to Formula One rules, held on 14 December 1963 at Kyalami, South Africa. The race was run over two heats, each of 25 laps of the circuit, and was won overall by British driver John Surtees in a Ferrari 156.

Surtees secured pole position for the first heat, and won with team-mate Lorenzo Bandini in second. This result was repeated in the second heat for the Ferraris to take the 1-2 positions very comfortably. Local drivers took the minor placings after Team Lotus suffered from fuel vaporisation problems.

Results

Blokdyk also entered his Cooper-Alfa Romeo and recorded a faster practice time in this car than in the car he ultimately raced.
Ferrari entered a third car but withdrew it without designating a driver.

References
 "The Grand Prix Who's Who", Steve Small, 1995.
 "The Formula One Record Book", John Thompson, 1974.
 Race results at www.silhouet.com

Rand Grand Prix
Rand Grand Prix
December 1963 sports events in Africa
1963 in South African motorsport